Beryl Fox (born December 10, 1931) is a Canadian documentary film director and film producer.

Biography
Fox was born in 1931  in Winnipeg, Manitoba. After graduating from the University of Toronto she was hired by the CBC and worked there from 1962 to 1966, first as a script assistant and researcher and then as a film director. Fox had a gift for understanding contemporary social and political conflicts. She was the first Canadian to do in depth, and frequently critical, explorations of the Vietnam War, race riots, and feminism in the United States. She has won three Canadian Film Awards; the first for Summer in Mississippi in 1965, a film about the civil rights movement and the second and third awards for her best-known film, The Mills of the Gods: Viet Nam in 1966. The film was shot entirely on location while the war was ongoing and had no narration and no archive footage. She continued making documentaries for another decade before branching out into producing feature films for mainstream audiences, beginning with 1981's Surfacing.

She was married to Douglas Leiterman, a CBC news producer whose show This Hour Has Seven Days aired several of Fox's documentary films, until his death in 2012.

Selected filmography
One More River (1963)
Three on a Match (1963)
The Single Woman and the Double Standard (1964)
Summer in Mississippi (1964)
The Mills of the Gods: Viet Nam (1965)
Youth: In Search of Morality (1966)
Saigon: Portrait of a City (1967)
Last Reflections on a War (1968)
Memorial to Martin Luther King (1969)
North with the Spring (1970)
The Visible Woman (1975)

References

External links

Complete Beryl Fox Filmography at CITWF
The Documentary conscience: a casebook in film making By Alan Rosenthal
The women's companion to international film By Annette Kuhn, Susannah Radstone
Guide to the cinema(s) of Canada By Peter Rist

1931 births
Living people
Canadian women film directors
Canadian documentary film producers
Film directors from Winnipeg
Canadian documentary film directors
Canadian Broadcasting Corporation people
University of Toronto alumni
Canadian women film producers
Canadian women documentary filmmakers